Myrthe Hilkens (born 31 January 1979 in Geleen) is a Dutch journalist, non-fiction writer, and politician. As a member of the Labour Party (Partij van de Arbeid), she was a temporary member of the House of Representatives of the Netherlands from April till August 2011, replacing Nebahat Albayrak, who was on maternity leave. As an MP, she dealt with matters of the European Union. On 17 January 2012, she became an MP once again, but she left parliament on 29 August 2013.

Hilkens grew up in Geleen, and later in Breda. She was partially raised as a Catholic, but renounced religion. She studied journalism at Fontys Academy of Journalism in Tilburg, and works as a freelance journalist and non-fiction writer. In 2003, she lived for half a year in an Israeli kibbutz.

Hilkens opposes the influence of pornography on society, and wrote a book about the subject called McSex, de pornoficatie van de samenleving (2008).

References 
  Parlement.com biography
  'Yo, ouders, denk eens na!', NRC Handelsblad, 22 November 2008

External links 
  House of Representatives biography

1979 births
Living people
Anti-pornography activists
Dutch activists
Dutch former Christians
Dutch women activists
Dutch expatriates in Israel
Dutch journalists
Dutch relationships and sexuality writers
Dutch political writers
21st-century Dutch women writers
21st-century Dutch writers
Former Roman Catholics
Labour Party (Netherlands) politicians
Members of the House of Representatives (Netherlands)
People from Geleen
Dutch women journalists
21st-century Dutch politicians
21st-century Dutch women politicians